Who is a celebrity news and entertainment weekly magazine published in Australia by Are Media.
It was launched in February 1992 as a sister magazine to the United States weekly People, with a name change facilitated because of an existing Australian lad's mag of the same name.

Between March 2012 and March 2013, Who had a circulation of 121,708 copies and a readership of 473,000. It is edited by Shari Nementzik, who previously edited OK! magazine.

References

External links
 Who.com
 Who blog
 Who Celebrity Index

1992 establishments in Australia
Are Media
Celebrity magazines
Magazines established in 1992
Weekly magazines published in Australia